Connor Calcutt (born 10 October 1993) is an English footballer who plays as a forward for Spartan South Midlands League Premier Division club Leighton Town.

After playing youth football with Hemel Hempstead Town, Calcutt started his senior career at Berkhamsted. After a dual registration period at St. Albans City, Calcutt signed for League Two side Stevenage in August 2014. Calcutt moved to Wealdstone on loan but suffered a leg break during his loan spell and was released by Stevenage at the end of the season. He went on to have spells with Wealdstone, Dunstable Town, Kings Langley, Barton Rovers, Farnborough, Hendon, Bedford Town, Eynesbury Rovers and Leighton Town.

Early career
Calcutt was born in Watford.

Career

Early career
Having been on the books of Hemel Hempstead Town as a youth player, Calcutt began his senior career with Berkhamsted, where he quickly gained a reputation as an exciting prospect, producing a 2013-14 tally of 41 goals from 52 appearances in all competitions. In the second half of that season, he joined St. Albans City as a dual-registration player, but only turned out for the side on one occasion. Towards the end of the season, he had a trial with Millwall.

Stevenage
Calcutt joined League Two club Stevenage on trial terms ahead of the 2014–15 season before signing a professional contract with Stevenage on 9 August, making his Football League debut that same day as a late substitute at home to Hartlepool United. Stevenage won the game 1–0. Calcutt's first professional goal came in only his second League appearance away at Plymouth Argyle in a 1–1 draw, where he came on at half time for the injured Darius Charles. Calcutt moved on a month's loan to Conference South side Wealdstone on 24 October 2014. He scored a brace on his debut for Wealdstone the following day in a 6–0 Middlesex Senior Cup win over Hampton & Richmond Borough. However, the striker suffered a leg break in their 2–0 win at Chelmsford City on 18 November 2014, ruling him out for what was initially estimated to be three months, but later thought to be eight to ten months. He was released by Stevenage at the end of the season.

Non-league football
In the summer of 2015, Calcutt returned to Wealdstone on a permanent basis. In October 2015 he signed on dual-registration at Southern Football League side Dunstable Town. After scoring 10 in 29 appearances at Dunstable Town, Calcutt signed for newly promoted Southern League Premier Division side Kings Langley in June 2016. However, Calcutt would begin the new season with Barton Rovers. He scored 28 goals in 33 league matches but left the club in summer 2017 to join Farnborough. He signed for Hendon for an undisclosed fee in October 2018.

At the end of November 2019, Calcutt moved to Bedford Town. During 2020, Calcutt also played for Eynesbury Rovers on a dual registration. Calcutt signed for Spartan South Midlands League Premier Division side Leighton Town in summer 2020.

Career statistics

References

1993 births
Living people
Sportspeople from Watford
English footballers
Hemel Hempstead Town F.C. players
Berkhamsted F.C. players
St Albans City F.C. players
Stevenage F.C. players
Wealdstone F.C. players
Dunstable Town F.C. players
Kings Langley F.C. players
Barton Rovers F.C. players
Farnborough F.C. players
Hendon F.C. players
Bedford Town F.C. players
Eynesbury Rovers F.C. players
Leighton Town F.C. players
English Football League players
Southern Football League players
National League (English football) players
Association football forwards
Footballers from Hertfordshire